The Borrmann effect (or Borrmann–Campbell effect after Gerhard Borrmann and Herbert N. Campbell) is the anomalous increase in the intensity of X-rays transmitted through a crystal when it is being set up for Bragg reflection.

The Borrmann effect—a dramatic increase in transparency to X-ray beams—is observed when X-rays satisfying Bragg's law diffract through a perfect crystal. The minimization of absorption seen in the Borrmann effect has been explained by noting that the electric field of the X-ray beam approaches zero amplitude at the crystal planes, thus avoiding the atoms.

References 

 Borrmann, Gerhard; Über Extinktionsdiagramme von Quarz, Physikalische Zeitschrift 42, 157–162 (1941); Die Absorption von Röntgenstrahlen im Fall der Interferenz, Zeitschrift für Physik 127, 297–323 (1950) - original articles on Borrmann effect
 Campbell, Herbert N.; X‐Ray Absorption in a Crystal Set at the Bragg Angle, Journal of Applied Physics 22, 1139 (1951)
 von Laue, Max; Die Absorption der Röntgenstrahlen in Kristallen im Interferenzfall, Acta Crystallographica 2, 106–113 (1949) - original explanation of Borrmann effect

X-ray crystallography